Giants (also released as Mary Lou Williams and the Trumpet Giants) is a live album by trumpeters Dizzy Gillespie and Bobby Hackett and pianist Mary Lou Williams recorded in 1971 and originally released on the Perception label.

Reception
The Allmusic review stated "The music (seven standards) is generally quite melodic and swinging but the closer, a classic version of "My Man," steals the show. It is interesting to hear the contrast between the two brassmen. Hackett was always a very complementary player, so the combination works well".

Track listing
 "Love for Sale" (Cole Porter) - 8:22
 "Autumn Leaves" (Joseph Kosma, Johnny Mercer, Jacques Prévert) - 6:33
 "Caravan" (Duke Ellington, Irving Mills, Juan Tizol) - 6:19
 "Jitterbug Waltz" (Fats Waller) - 7:10
 "Willow Weep for Me" (Ann Ronell) - 5:23
 "Birk's Works" (Dizzy Gillespie) - 7:06
 "My Man" (Jacques Charles, Channing Pollock, Albert Willemetz, Maurice Yvain) -  8:23

Personnel
Dizzy Gillespie, Bobby Hackett - trumpet
Mary Lou Williams - piano
George Duvivier - bass
Grady Tate - drums

References 

Perception Records albums
Dizzy Gillespie live albums
1971 live albums